
Garwolin County is a unit of territorial administration and local government (powiat) in Masovian Voivodeship, east-central Poland. It came into being on 1 January 1999, as a result of the Polish local government reforms passed in 1998.

As of 2019 its total population is 104,917, out of which the population of Garwolin is 17,501, that of Łaskarzew is 4,840, that of Pilawa is 4,578, that of Żelechów is 3,988, and the rural population is 74,010.

Neighbouring counties 
Garwolin County is bordered by Mińsk County to the north, Siedlce County to the north-east, Łuków County to the east, Ryki County to the south-east, Kozienice County to the south, Grójec County to the west and Otwock County to the north-west.

Administrative division
The county is subdivided into 14 gminas (two urban, two urban-rural and 10 rural). These are listed in the following table, in descending order of population.

References

 
Garwolin